State Route 423 (SR 423) is a  state highway north-south state highway in northern Carroll County, Tennessee. It connects the city of Mckenzie with the community of Mixie.

Route description

SR 423 begins in McKenzie at an intersection with US 79 (SR 76) just east of downtown. It heads southeast through neighborhoods as Shiloh Road to have an intersection with SR 22 before leaving McKenzie and continuing east through rural areas. It winds its way through farmland for several miles, where it becomes Macedonia-Rice Store Road and crosses a bridge over a creek, before passing through wooded and slightly hilly terrain. The highway then reenters farmland as it enters Mixie, shortly before it comes to an end at an intersection with SR 77. The entire route of SR 423 is a two-lane highway.

Major intersections

References

423
Transportation in Carroll County, Tennessee